in Portuguese is any type of assembly, installation or electrical device, intended for preparing churrasco. It usually comes with a fixed or removable grill or gridiron.

"Grill", "grillroom", and "grill area" are common English translations for churrasqueira.

In Brazil, a churrasqueira is often a brick pillar with a grilling space in the middle. In a Brazilian barbecue, a variety of meats, pork, sausage, and chicken are cooked on a purpose-built churrasqueira, frequently with supports for spits or skewers. Portable churrasqueiras are similar to those used to prepare the Argentine and Uruguayan asado, with a grill support, but many Brazilian churrasqueiras do not have grills, only the skewers above the embers. The meat may alternatively be cooked on large metal or wood skewers resting on a support or stuck into the ground and roasted with the embers of charcoal (wood may also be used, especially in the state of Rio Grande do Sul).

See also 
 Churrascaria

References 

Barbecue
Brazilian cuisine
Cooking appliances